Thirunelly  is a village in Wayanad district in the state of Kerala, India.

Thirunelli Temple is a very famous temple located in this village.

Demographics
 India census, Thirunelly had a population of 11719 with 5774 males and 5945 females.

Transportation
Thirunelly village can be accessed from Mananthavady or Kalpetta. The Periya ghat road connects Mananthavady to Kannur and Thalassery.  The Thamarassery mountain road connects Calicut with Kalpetta. The Kuttiady mountain road connects Vatakara with Kalpetta and Mananthavady. The Palchuram mountain road connects Kannur and Iritty with Mananthavady.  The road from Nilambur to Ooty is also connected to Wayanad through the village of Meppadi.

If you are travelling from Karnataka, it can be accessed by road via the towns of Tithimathi-Gonikoppal-Ponnampet-Kutta (all in the Kodagu District)

The nearest railway station is at Mysore and the nearest airports are Kozhikode International Airport-120 km, Bengaluru International Airport-290 km, and   Kannur International Airport, 58 km.

See also
 Kattikkulam
 Mananthavady
 Valliyoorkkavu
 Pakshi Pathalam is a trekking site some seven kilometers from Thirunelli temple near Kattikkkulam.  There is an ancient cave on the hillock with plenty of birds.

References

Mananthavady Area
Villages in Wayanad district

ta:திருநெல்லி